Dundee Township may refer to:

 Dundee Township, Kane County, Illinois
 Dundee Township, Michigan

Township name disambiguation pages